Days to Come is the third studio album by British musician Bonobo. It was released on 2 October 2006 on the Ninja Tune independent record label.

It has been released in two versions - a standard 1 disc edition (ZENCD119) and a limited edition (ZENCD119X) with a second disc containing instrumental versions of the album's vocal tracks.

Track listing
Tracks 1, 4, 5, 7, 8 and 11 are written and performed by Simon Green; others are credited as is.

Limited edition bonus disc

Use in Media

The track "Ketto" featured in Skins and was also used in the commercial for the launch of the Citroën C4 Picasso in 2007. "Nightlite", appeared on UEFA Champions League 2006–2007, and "Recurring" was used in a surfing film broadcast on Fuel TV.

"Hatoa" uses samples from the Pentangle song "Light Flight".

Awards

The album was voted Album of the Year in the 2006 Worldwide Awards on Gilles Peterson's BBC Radio 1 show.

In 2012 it was awarded a silver certification from the Independent Music Companies Association which indicated sales of at least 20,000 copies throughout Europe.

References

Bonobo (musician) albums
2006 albums
Ninja Tune albums